Gastrothrips is a genus of thrips in the family Phlaeothripidae.

Species
 Gastrothrips abditus
 Gastrothrips acuticornis
 Gastrothrips acutulus
 Gastrothrips alticola
 Gastrothrips anahuacensis
 Gastrothrips anolis
 Gastrothrips callipus
 Gastrothrips citriceps
 Gastrothrips corvus
 Gastrothrips curvidens
 Gastrothrips eurypelta
 Gastrothrips falcatus
 Gastrothrips fulvicauda
 Gastrothrips fulviceps
 Gastrothrips fumipennis
 Gastrothrips fuscatus
 Gastrothrips harti
 Gastrothrips heterocerus
 Gastrothrips intonsus
 Gastrothrips jalisciensis
 Gastrothrips mandiocae
 Gastrothrips mauli
 Gastrothrips mongolicus
 Gastrothrips monticola
 Gastrothrips procerus
 Gastrothrips proturus
 Gastrothrips pueblae
 Gastrothrips ruficauda
 Gastrothrips saetiger
 Gastrothrips stygicus
 Gastrothrips subulatus
 Gastrothrips tenuipennis
 Gastrothrips terrestris
 Gastrothrips texanus
 Gastrothrips timidus
 Gastrothrips turbinatus
 Gastrothrips xosa

References

Phlaeothripidae
Thrips genera